The Sunflower Ranger Station, also known as Sunflower Administrative Site or Sycamore Ranger Station, in Tonto National Forest in the Sunflower district near Punkin Center, Arizona was built in 1935 by the Civilian Conservation Corps.  It was listed on the National Register of Historic Places in 1993 for its architecture, which is Bungalow/Craftsman in style.  It served historically as institutional housing and as government office space.  The listing included two contributing buildings.

The station consists of six buildings (a residence/office, a barn/garage/shop, three sheds and a latrine) and a corral. The residence/office and the barn/garage/shop were built in 1935 and are the two contributing resources in the listing.

References

United States Forest Service ranger stations
Civilian Conservation Corps in Arizona
American Craftsman architecture in Arizona
Bungalow architecture in Arizona
Park buildings and structures on the National Register of Historic Places in Arizona
Residential buildings completed in 1935
Buildings and structures in Maricopa County, Arizona
Coronado National Forest
National Register of Historic Places in Maricopa County, Arizona
1935 establishments in Arizona